Living Tomorrow is an internationally operating research organization that realizes projects around living and working in the future. Their brand new innovation campus, which is currently under construction, is located in Brussels.

About Living Tomorrow 
 
Since 1991, Living Tomorrow has been realising projects that reflect a vision of the future. The organization started as 'the House of the Future' but is nowadays engaged in projects about the future of mobility, healthcare, smart homes, smart buildings and smart cities. It acts as a future-oriented research institution and as a marketing and co-creation platform for companies, governments and organizations. It also serves as a source of inspiration for visitors. 

Living Tomorrow's sister organisation TomorrowLab provides consultancy services to organisations and companies in connection with strategy, innovation and foresight.

Innovations 
Living Tomorrow demonstrates various innovations and innovative products. In this way, visitors and participants get the chance to discover the future, to give feedback or even to work together in an innovative ecosystem. Furthermore, the innovation campus can help bring these innovations and products to the market more efficiently and successfully. In the meantime, hundreds of successful market products and services have already emerged that were the first to be tested and shown in Living Tomorrow.

Examples 

      The first home automation systems (Teletask & Philips - 1995)
      Google Earth look-a-like travel applications (Thomas Cook & Sunjets - 1996)
      Barcode readers to order your groceries (Carrefour & Zetes - 1996)
      Recycling of PMD/residual waste (Fost Plus -1997)
      Smart doorbells (Siedle - 1997)
      Electrochromic blackout windows (Saint-Roch - 1997)
      The smart mailbox for e-commerce and pack stations (DHL - 2001)
      The first banking app (ING, 2003)
      Self-checkout in the supermarket (Delhaize - 2007)
      Smart energy meters (Eandis & Engie - 2010)
      The ambulance drone (TUDelft - 2012)
      Solar charging for EVs (ABB - 2013)
      AI Digital Twin for Health Checkup (Medtronic - 2020)
      Storing CO2 in concrete (Holcim Lafarge – 2022)
      Holographic interactive building model in 4D BIM (Schüco – 2022)

Through the ecosystem of many companies and governments to develop, test and realize new products and through the collaboration with visitors on the basis of hackathons, Living Tomorrow has grown into an internationally known innovation campus, which is currently still being expanded.

Origins and history 
Early years

In 1990, Frank Beliën started the Living Tomorrow project. Driven by questions such as: "How is technology changing our lives? How will we live, work and spend our lives tomorrow? In 1994, Joachim De Vos came on board and in 1995 the first "House of the Future" opened. The project was officially opened on 16 March 1995 by, among others, Bill Gates, then CEO of Microsoft, and Belgian Prime Minister Jean-Luc Dehaene. At the start, it was promised that a new complex would be built every five years, which is what has actually happened up to the present day.

House of the Future (1995-2000)

The first "House of the Future" was built in Vilvoorde, next to the Ring of Brussels exit 6. It had 163 participating organisations and received 300,000 visitors during its term. It introduced the world to home automation, barcode scanners, solar panels, world-wide web services, Belgium's first website, 100MB LAN, the first ISDN videoconferencing, ADSL, the mobile phone and the laptop. The architecture was also progressive due to the use of then innovative materials such as aerated concrete, laminate cladding and a zinc roof without cavity. The architecture was developed entirely in 3D by Androme (Hasselt University). 

Living Tomorrow II (2000-2005)

In 2000, in addition to the first building, a new and larger complex was built, Living Tomorrow 2. 
It included a new House of the Future and an Office of the Future. More than 97 companies participated and the number of visitors rose to 550,000. Numerous innovations were presented for the first time: interactive TV, IP telephony, voice recognition, delivery box and the electric car.

Living Tomorrow Amsterdam (2004-2009)

In 2004, Living Tomorrow opened a building in Amsterdam. The project was built with the help of the Dutch government and 40 larger companies. 750,000 visitors came to see it. 
The revolutionary 'blup' architecture used, in collaboration with UNStudio's and Ben van Berkel, set a new building trend in motion and is still an eye-catcher today. Currently, the building is being used by a Dutch bank.

Living Tomorrow III (2007-2012)

At the same location of the previous building in Vilvoorde, a new project was realized. More than 120 building innovations were used (mainly plastic materials). This can still be seen in the typical blue shell at the front of the building. The big eye-catcher was the kitchen of the future, designed by Zaha Hadid, titled the Z-Island. The technological tour de force was exhibited at the Guggenheim Museum in New York shortly before the opening. Since then, the futuristic furniture has been on display at Living Tomorrow. The project received 70 partners and 500,000 visitors.  

Living Tomorrow IV (2012-2017)

Living Tomorrow 4 consisted of 2 subprojects. The first part included the further expansion of the existing Living Tomorrow 3 building with new demonstrations on smart cities and electric mobility. As well as the energy landscape, the store and healthcare of the future. These demonstrations were visualisations of the future research of sister organisation Tomorrowlab, a consultancy for strategy and innovation. They were carried out in close cooperation with companies such as Colruyt Group, ABB, De Lijn, Randstad and bpost.

A second part involved the realisation of a 'living lab' in Heusden-Zolder: the Care Home of the Future. The project ran between 2013 and 2016 and included an innovative assisted living home, an innovative care room and a pharmacy of the future. In addition, technologies and services were integrated into a residential care centre that accommodated 200 senior citizens. That project also introduced many innovations: remote diagnosis via an intelligent mirror, a 24/7 pharmacy robot, polypill, and a synthetic floor in the bathroom. The project had 90 participants and provided awareness, research and development.

Living Tomorrow Innvationcampus 
Since 2019, Living Tomorrow has been in full preparation of a new project that will provide a vision of living, housing and working in 2030: the Living Tomorrow innovation campus. The project will be a combination of a living lab for co-creation of new ideas, a demonstration zone around 5 major themes, an event centre and a restaurant. Innovation and the future are central to this campus. Working groups on digital twins, home experiences, sustainability, future cities, etc. will be used to examine which innovations will shape the future. In addition, the campus will include various digital experiences, such as a virtual tour. 

The aim of this edition is more than ever to give companies, cities and people the opportunity to prepare for the future to the maximum extent and to actively participate in it. Organisations from all over the world will use the Living Tomorrow innovation campus to demonstrate their innovations and work together towards the future through partnerships and customer feedback. Local companies are given an international showcase to visualise their knowledge and skills to visitors. The construction site has been open for visitors since the end of 2020. The innovation campus will open in 2023. 

5 key themes

Living Tomorrow and its partners are joining forces around five themes: smart homes & services, smart mobility & logistics, smart health, smart buildings & infrastructure and smart cities & industry 4.0. These are themes with a major impact on society, affecting citizens, organisations, cities and municipalities as well as companies. For example, research is being done into the role AI can play in healthcare, but also into how we can build smarter in the future, with a focus on sustainability.

Partners

To shape the new Living Tomorrow, 100 organisations will be admitted to this edition of the project. Each one expert in its field. At present, some three-quarters of the places have already been taken by, among others: Mercedes-Benz, Miele, BDO, Fluvius, Baloise, Schüco and ABB.

Iconic building

The Living Tomorrow innovation campus includes a brand new tower that will be highly visionary in terms of both architecture and technology. The campus will be built on the current Living Tomorrow site and will give the skyline of the Brussels Ring a future-oriented look. In addition to the innovative demo areas, the new building includes a conference centre and a hotel. The new site will be completely energy-neutral and will focus on a hybrid experience. 

Meeting & Event Center and Restaurant

Living Tomorrow also has an extensive meeting centre. With 10 meeting rooms, including an auditorium, lounge and VIP board room. Living Tomorrow also has a culinary restaurant on their site, The Bistronomy. Led by star chef Marc Clement, his team conjures up affordable gastronomy with fresh, original creations. Always with a nod to the future.

Sources 
 "Living Tomorrow's website
 BBC News Video article- "Inside the House of the Future"

Research and development organizations